Warushavithana Saman Jayantha (born 26 January 1974), known as Saman Jayantha, is a former Sri Lankan cricketer who played 17 One Day Internationals for Sri Lanka in 2004 before he was dropped by the Sri Lankan selectors.

International career
He started his international career by scoring 24 runs in two matches against Australia as a middle order batsman, but improved during Sri Lanka's 5–0 whitewash of Zimbabwe in April 2004, hitting a career-best 74 not out to guide Sri Lanka to a nine-wicket win in the second ODI. However, he only played three of Sri Lanka's six matches during the 2004 Asia Cup, and was in and out of the team until successive ducks against Pakistan and New Zealand caused his exit from the team.

Domestic career
He made his Twenty20 debut on 17 August 2004, for Bloomfield Cricket and Athletic Club in the 2004 SLC Twenty20 Tournament.

Jayantha was also part of the Sri Lankan team that lifted the Hong Kong Cricket Sixes title in 2007 where he was also the leading wicket taker in that tournament with 6 wickets. In the 2003 Hong Kong Sixes he was the leading runscorer scoring 152 runs and went on to win the man of the tournament award. He is also the only Sri Lankan to have won the "Man of the tournament" award in Hong Kong Sixes history.

References

External links
 

Sri Lankan cricketers
1974 births
Living people
Sri Lanka One Day International cricketers
Bloomfield Cricket and Athletic Club cricketers
Basnahira cricketers
Ruhuna cricketers
Kandurata cricketers
Alumni of Dharmasoka College
People from Ambalangoda